Massa  is a town and comune in Tuscany, central Italy, the administrative centre of the province of Massa and Carrara. It is located in the Frigido River Valley, near the Alpi Apuane,  from the Tyrrhenian Sea.

History

Massa is mentioned for the first time in the Tabula Peutingeriana, a 2nd-4th century AD itinerary, with the name ad Tabernas frigidas, referring perhaps to a stage on the Via Aemilia Scauri consular road from Pisa to Luni.

From the 15th to the 19th century, Massa was the capital of the independent Principate (later Duchy) of Massa and Carrara, ruled by the Malaspina and Cybo-Malaspina families. Massa is the first recorded town in Europe in which the magnetic needle compass was used in mines to map them and determine the extent of various mine owners' properties.

In 1829 the states were inherited by Francis IV, Duke of Modena. In 1859, during the unification of Italy process, it joined the Kingdom of Sardinia.

Geography
Located in south of the province, near the borders with the Province of Lucca, Massa is a coastal town by the Tyrrhenian Sea. The municipality borders with Carrara, Fivizzano, Minucciano (LU), Montignoso, Seravezza (LU), Stazzema (LU) and Vagli Sotto (LU).

Frazioni
Massa counts several hamlets (frazioni): Altagnana, Alteta, Antona, Baita, Bargana, Bergiola, Bondano, Borgo del Ponte, Bozzone, Ca' di Cecco, Caglieglia, Campareccia, Canevara, Capaccola, Casania, Casone, Castagnara, Castagnetola, Castagnola, Cervara, Cinque Vie, Ciremea, Codupino, Cupido, Forno, La Gioconda, Gotara, Gronda, Grondini, Guadine, Le Iare, Lavacchio, Marina di Massa, Mirteto, Monte Pepe, Ortola, Pariana, Partaccia, Pian della Fioba, Poggi, Poggiolo, Poggioletto, il Ponte, Poveromo, Poveromo Macchie, Pratta, Puliche, Quercioli, Redicesi, Remola, Resceto, Ricortola, Rinchiostra, Rocca, Romagnano, Ronchi, San Carlo Terme, San Cristoforo, San Leonardo, San Lorenzo, Santa Lucia, Il Santo, Sei ponti, Turano, Vergheto, Le Villette, Volpigliano, Zecca.

Economy
The Massa area is of high touristic value and also hosts a concentration of some 600 industrial and craft activities, located within the so-called Apuan Industrial Zone, with a direct employment of more than 7,000 people. Together with the twin town of Carrara, Massa is known for the extraction and production of marble.

Government

Main sights
Massa's sights include:

Malaspina castle (15th century), overlooking the city from a hill
Ducal Palace, Renaissance palace on the Piazza Aranci
The Cathedral
Piazza degli Aranci
Piazza Mercurio
Marina di Massa
Orto Botanico delle Alpi Apuane "Pietro Pellegrini" is a mountain botanical garden maintained by the city.

Transport
Buses
Consorzio Apuano Trasporti, also known as CAT, was the company that, since 1 January 1969, managed the local public transport by road in the province of Massa-Carrara. CAT went bankrupt in 2009 and was taken over by Autolinee Toscana Nord ATN. On 1 February 2015 ATN leased its management branch, vehicles, staff and facilities to CTT Nord until the end of the contract for the local public transport of the Tuscany.
CTT Nord together with VaiBus in 2017 extended its stay as a concessioner of ATN until 31 December 2019, from 1 January 2020 leased its management branch to RATP Dev, a company of the French RATP group, awarding the contract for local public transport by road of the Tuscany Region.
Train
Massa Centro railway station, opened in 1862, forms part of the Pisa–La Spezia–Genoa railway. 
Motorway
The city is connected to Autostrada A12 and the national highway "SS 1 Aurelia".
Airport
Massa-Cinquale Airport (IATA: QMM, ICAO: LILQ) is a general aviation airport located in the neighboring village of Cinquale. 
Tramway
From 1890 to 1932 Massa counted on a railway line from Marina to Forno and, from 1922 to 1975, a monorail serving a marble quarry named Lizza di Piastreta.

Sister cities

Massa is twinned with:
 Bad Kissingen, Germany, since 1960
 Vernon, France,
 Nowy Sącz, Poland, since 2007

References

Sources

External links

Massa official website 

 
Cities and towns in Tuscany
Coastal towns in Tuscany
Municipalities of the Province of Massa-Carrara